S/T is the sixth studio album by American band Rainer Maria. It was released on August 18, 2017, under Polyvinyl Record Co.

Track listing

References

2017 albums
Rainer Maria albums
Polyvinyl Record Co. albums